Renda Parish is an administrative unit of Kuldīga Municipality in the Courland region of Latvia. The parish has a population of 1091 (as of 1/07/2010) and covers an area of 263.35 km2. The administrative center is the village of Renda.

Villages of Renda parish 
 Āpciems
 Ezeri
 Jaunmeži
 Kroņrenda
 Mazrenda
 Ozoli
 Renda
 Tiezumi

External links 
 Renda parish 

Parishes of Latvia
Kuldīga Municipality
Courland